Paracyprichromis is a small genus of cichlids endemic to Lake Tanganyika in east Africa.

Species
There are currently two recognized species in this genus:
 Paracyprichromis brieni (Poll, 1981)
 Paracyprichromis nigripinnis (Boulenger, 1901)

References

 
Cyprichromini
Cichlid genera
Taxa named by Max Poll